The name Lizars is best known as a family of artists and engravers of Scottish origin:

 Daniel Lizars Sr. (1754–1812), engraver and editor, father of: 
 John Lizars (c.1787–1860), Professor of Surgery at the Royal College of Surgeons,
 William Home Lizars (1788–1859), engraver, artist, and editor
 Daniel Lizars (1793–1875), his son, engraver and editor.